Elizabeth Best is an Australian author from Bendigo, Victoria.

The Year We Seized the Day (2007) co-authored with Colin Bowles, is a non-fiction travel book describing the two authors' shared journey along the Camino de Santiago. It is an Amazon.com bestseller and continues to sell internationally. 

Eli's Wings was first published by Penguin Books Australia Ltd. 2002. It became a bestseller on release and earned several reprints and new additions, and was published internationally. Eli's Wings chronicles Best's personal struggle with and full recovery from, a life threatening case of anorexia and how she overcame it: "Eli was an alter ego I created," Best said. "I hated absolutely everything about myself. Eli was a blueprint for who I wanted to be."

Elizabeth Best is the daughter of Ron Best.

References

External links
The Year We Seized The day
Personal website
Ron Best

1977 births
Living people
Australian children's writers
Australian travel writers
Women travel writers